Todd Gilles (born April 14, 1986) is an American former ice dancer. With Trina Pratt, he won four ISU Junior Grand Prix medals and the 2005 U.S. national junior title, and placed sixth at the 2006 World Junior Championships. With Jane Summersett, he is the 2008 Nebelhorn Trophy bronze medalist. He also skated with Emily Samuelson for one season.

Personal life 
Todd Gilles was born in Rockford, Illinois. He has three younger sisters, Piper, who competes for Canada in ice dancing, Alexe, a single skater and Shelby Gilles, who is not in the ice dancing scene. He also has a younger brother, Kemper Gilles. All five of the Gilles children attended Cheyenne Mountain High School. He enjoys mountaineering.

Career 
Gilles teamed up with Trina Pratt at the 2002 Lake Placid, New York dance competition. They won the 2003 US National Novice title, as well as, the 2005 US National Junior title. After a promising start on the senior international circuit, they announced the ending of their partnership on December 13, 2006, with Pratt deciding to take a break from competitive skating.

Gilles teamed up with Jane Summersett in April 2007. Their best result was a bronze medal at the 2008 Nebelhorn Trophy. After Summersett retired from competitive skating in 2010, he worked as a skating coach in Lake Placid.

On August 22, 2011, Gilles and Emily Samuelson announced their newly formed partnership. In September, they revealed they would train in Ann Arbor, Michigan, coached by Nechaeva and Chesnichenko with choreography by Tom Dickson and Christopher Dean. In November 2011, they competed in their first event together, the 2011 Cup of China, where they finished 8th. At the time, they had been skating together for approximately two months, and had had their programs choreographed one month earlier. Samuelson and Gilles confirmed the end of their partnership in June 2012.

Programs

With Samuelson

With Summersett

With Pratt

Competitive highlights 

GP: Grand Prix; JGP: Junior Grand Prix

With Samuelson

With Summersett

With Pratt

References

External links

 
 
 

Living people
1986 births
Sportspeople from Rockford, Illinois
American male ice dancers
American people of Canadian descent